Jumbo shopping centre, commonly referred to as simply Jumbo, is a shopping center in Vantaa, Finland.

Jumbo was completed in October 1999. It currently employs approximately 1,500 people. It has two hypermarket chains: Prisma (owned by S Group) and K-Citymarket (owned by Kesko).

History
Jumbo's foundation was laid before the recession of the 1990s due to the great demand that arose in the area for a shopping center. The construction companies Haka and Polar purchased the area and its surroundings from the consumers' co-operative Elanto and named the newly established development company Vantaanportti Oy. The company also purchased the neighboring residential areas and business park land. In October 1999, Jumbo was completed. In its first year, the shopping center attracted 6 million customers, with the number of customers rising since. An expansion was completed in 2005.

In 2008, the Flamingo entertainment center was built next to Jumbo. Prior to completion, it was referred to as "Jumbo Park", as it is connected to the shopping center and the two centers act in co-operation rather than competition. Together, the two are referred to in Finnish as Viihdekauppakeskus (entertainment shopping centre).

Gallery

References

Shopping centres in Vantaa